Abacetus spissus is a species of ground beetle in the subfamily Pterostichinae. It was described by Andrewes in 1937.

References

spissus
Beetles described in 1937